Myerscough may refer to:

 Myerscough, Lancashire, a hamlet and former civil parish in the English county of Lancashire
 Myerscough and Bilsborrow, the larger civil parish in which Myerscough is now situated
 Myerscough College, a Higher and Further Education college in Myerscough
Myerscough (surname), an English surname which originated in the hamlet.